Tezkereci Ahmed Pasha (died 8 August 1648), better known as Hezarpare Ahmed Pasha after his death, was an Ottoman grand vizier and defterdar (finance minister).

Early life
Ahmed was a son of a professional soldier of probable Albanian origin. Instead of following his father's footsteps into the military, he chose to go into bureaucracy. He was appointed to several posts, one of which was the personal secretary (tezkereci) of the grand vizier Kemankeş Mustafa Pasha, gaining the epithet tezkereci after this appointment. In 1646, two years after Mustafa Pasha's execution, he was appointed as the defterdar, and in 1647, he was promoted to the rank of grand vizier, the highest post in Ottoman bureaucracy.

Grand Vizierate
Sultan Ibrahim (sometimes called Ibrahim the Mad) was a rather unbalanced sultan. He was a connoisseur of sable skin coats and forced his grand vizier to buy huge quantities of sable skin for his palaces. Because of this, Ahmed Pasha was required to concentrate more of his time on the sable trade rather than on state affairs. During his term, the Venetian navy blocked the strait of Çanakkale (Dardanelles), and Venice also seized control of the important fort of Klis (in modern Croatia); see Cretan War (1645-1669). Moreover, large scale sable skin purchases caused an extra deficit in a budget that was already under the pressure of the war.

Death
In 1648, Ahmed Pasha levied a heavy tax to meet the heavy expenditures of the budget. However, this step caused anger and rebellion among the populace of the Ottoman Empire. He was lynched on 8 August 1648, and his body was cut into many pieces by the angry mob. The epithet Hezarpare is a Persian epithet he gained after his death, meaning "thousand pieces," referring to the fate of his corpse after his lynching. A few days after Ahmed Pasha's murder, the sultan Ibrahim was also killed.

See also
 List of Ottoman Grand Viziers
 List of Ottoman Ministers of Finance

References

17th-century Grand Viziers of the Ottoman Empire
Pashas
1648 deaths
Defterdar
Assassinated people from the Ottoman Empire
Year of birth unknown